Francis Alexander Hopkins (May 27, 1853 – June 5, 1918) was an American lawyer and politician who served two terms as a U.S. Representative from Kentucky from 1903 to 1907.

Biography 
Born in Jeffersonville, Virginia, Hopkins attended the public schools and the Tazewell High School. He studied law. He was admitted to the bar in November 1874 and commenced practice in Prestonsburg, Kentucky. He also engaged in agricultural pursuits. He served as commissioner of common schools 1882-1884. He served as member of the State constitutional convention in 1890.

Congress 
Hopkins was elected as a Democrat to the Fifty-eighth and Fifty-ninth Congresses (March 4, 1903 – March 3, 1907). He was an unsuccessful candidate for reelection in 1906 to the Sixtieth Congress. He served as delegate to the Democratic National Convention in 1916.

Later career and death 
He resumed agricultural pursuits and the practice of law in Prestonsburg, Kentucky, and died there on June 5, 1918. He was interred in Davidson Cemetery.

References

1853 births
1918 deaths
People from Tazewell, Virginia
Kentucky lawyers
Democratic Party members of the United States House of Representatives from Kentucky
19th-century American politicians
19th-century American lawyers